Samantha Wallace (born 16 January 1994) is a netball player from Trinidad and Tobago, who plays for the New South Wales Swifts in the Suncorp Super Netball league.

Career
Wallace moved to Australia to play for the New South Wales Swifts at the start of the 2017 season, having been recruited from the Hertfordshire Mavericks of the English Netball League. She is the first player from Trinidad and Tobago to play in Australia's netball competition. Wallace has played at the goal shooter and attack positions for the duration of her time at the Swifts. In 2019 she was part of the Swifts premiership team and was awarded the MVP Award for her performance in the 2019 Super Netball Grand Final.

Wallace has represented the Trinidad and Tobago national netball team at the 2015 and 2019 Netball World Cup.

References

Living people
1994 births
Trinidad and Tobago netball players
New South Wales Swifts players
Netball Superleague players
Mavericks netball players
Suncorp Super Netball players
2019 Netball World Cup players
Trinidad and Tobago expatriate sportspeople in Australia
Trinidad and Tobago expatriate sportspeople in England
2015 Netball World Cup players